Richard Frederick Robert Pochin Boyle (11 October 1888 – 6 February 1953)  was a British coxswain who competed in the 1908 Summer Olympics.

Boyle was born at Ipsden, Oxfordshire, the son of Major Charles John Boyle and Lillian Kennedy Pochin. Boyle was educated at Cambridge University and coxed the Cambridge boat in the Boat Race in 1907 and 1908. The Cambridge crew made up a boat in the eights which won the bronze medal rowing at the 1908 Summer Olympics.

In the First World War, Boyle was a captain in the Oxfordshire and Buckinghamshire Light Infantry and was wounded.

Boyle married Marion Elisa Hill Wallace, daughter of Major-General Hill Wallace, on 12 February 1918

See also
List of Cambridge University Boat Race crews

References

1888 births
1953 deaths
English male rowers
British male rowers
Olympic rowers of Great Britain
Rowers at the 1908 Summer Olympics
Olympic bronze medallists for Great Britain
Coxswains (rowing)
Olympic medalists in rowing
Alumni of Trinity Hall, Cambridge
Medalists at the 1908 Summer Olympics
British Army personnel of World War I
Oxfordshire and Buckinghamshire Light Infantry officers